Any Other Day may refer to:

Any Other Day, film from Rainbow Reel Tokyo
"Any Other Day", song by Bon Jovi from Lost Highway (Bon Jovi album)
"Any Other Day", song by Hilary Duff from soundtrack to What Goes Up